Ian Davidson is a British scriptwriter who also acted, directed and produced in television and the theatre from the 1960s. After performing and writing with Michael Palin and Terry Jones at Oxford University - his first BBC writing credit was for That Was the Week That Was in 1963 - he became an actor at The Second City in Chicago.
Returning to the UK, he worked for Ned Sherrin (as a film director) and David Frost, and then began a lifelong association with Barry Humphries as a writer and director.
He appears, briefly, in many of the Monty Python's Flying Circus episodes - notably as a Dead Indian On a Pile of Dung, and as a news reporter who interrupts a sketch to say that it's his first time appearing on television.
He was Script Editor of The Two Ronnies from 1978 to 1983 and with Peter Vincent wrote seven series of the sitcom Sorry! With Vincent he also wrote for Dave Allen, The Brittas Empire and Comrade Dad. With John Chapman, he wrote French Fields for Thames Television.
In 2013, Vincent and Davidson wrote When the Dog Dies for Radio 4.

External links

Year of birth missing (living people)
Living people
British male television actors
British television writers
British male television writers